Venatrix furcillata, one of the wolf spiders, is a mid sized spider found in eastern Australia. The body length of the female is up to 13 mm, the male 9 mm. The abdomen has distinctive tapering markings. Sometimes noted in suburban gardens and lawns. It lives in a simple burrow, but may be seen migrating in large numbers to a communal web, an unusual feature for wolf spiders. The grey coloured spherical egg sac is around 6 mm in diameter, carried by the female. Eggs are 45 to 60 in number, 0.8 mm in diameter. Prey is ground dwelling insects.  The spider has been identified as occurring in Queensland, New South Wales, and Victoria.

See also 
 List of Lycosidae species

References

Lycosidae
Spiders of Australia
Spiders described in 1867